The following is the discography of the Stafford Brothers, DJs and producers from Australia known for blending the genres of house. They have released DJ mixes on Ministry of Sound Australia with artists such as Tommy Trash and Steve Aoki, as well as many singles. Among their better known songs are "Hello", which charted at No. 4 on the ARIA chart.

DJ mixes

Singles

Other releases

Notes

References

External links
 

Discographies of Australian artists